

Physics

Other namesakes

 Bloch Auditorium, Hewlett Teaching Center room 201, Stanford University
 Bloch Beamline at MAX IV Laboratory
 Bloch Fellowship in quantum science and engineering at Stanford University

References

Bloch